Philiris albihumerata is a species of butterfly of the family Lycaenidae. It is found in north-western West Irian (Snow Mountains).

References

Butterflies described in 1963
Luciini